William Oliver Reese (born 1987) is a US Navy airman who, on January 3, 2006 murdered 56-year-old Japanese woman Yoshie Sato in Yokosuka, Japan. He later confessed to the crime. Reese is currently serving life in prison in Japan. Reese was stationed on the USS Kitty Hawk (CV-63).

Details of the crime
On January 3, William Oliver Reese was near the Yokosuka-Chūō train station when he accosted 56-year-old Yoshie Sato, demanding money. Reese was intoxicated at the time. At first, he asked her for directions to the nearby naval base, and after she pointed it out to him, he attempted to take her purse. When Sato began yelling for help, Reese dragged her to a nearby stairwell and proceeded to beat her for 11 minutes. Sato later died of a ruptured kidney. He then removed 15,000 yen from her purse and left the scene.  Some accounts claim that Reese was apprehended by US Navy sentries at the main gate to Yokosuka Naval Base, who became suspicious when they noticed Reese's bloodstained clothes; other accounts state that he was actually caught aboard the Kitty Hawk as he attempted to return to work. He would later claim that he had no idea why he killed her.

International repercussions
When Reese was indicted and subsequently convicted after making a full confession there were many calls for a Status of Forces Agreement revision. While judges called the murder "shocking" and "dreadful", they cited Reese's confession, among other factors, as their justification for sparing him from a possible death sentence. Severe liberty restrictions were also enacted by the US Navy upon its sailors stationed in the region. The restrictions applied to all sailors and included such measures as curfews and detailed "liberty plans" (written statements of a sailor's exact whereabouts throughout the day).

References

American people convicted of murder
Prisoners sentenced to life imprisonment by Japan
American prisoners sentenced to life imprisonment
People from New Jersey
1987 births
Living people
American people imprisoned abroad
People convicted of murder by Japan
African-American people